Schistoglossa is a genus of beetles belonging to the family Staphylinidae.

The species of this genus are found in Europe and Northern America.

Species:
 Schistoglossa approximata (Bernhauer, 1909) 
 Schistoglossa aubei (Brisout de Barneville, 1860)

References

Staphylinidae
Staphylinidae genera